Raisa Strom-Okimoto (born October 25, 1997) is a retired American professional soccer player who most recently played as a forward for Kansas City in the National Women's Soccer League (NWSL).

Strom-Okimoto made her debut for Utah Royals as a substitute against Portland Thorns in June 2019.

On July 2, 2021, Strom-Okimoto was named as a National Team Replacement player with the Thorns.

References

External links
 Hawaii bio
 

1997 births
Living people
American women's soccer players
Utah Royals FC players
National Women's Soccer League players
Hawaii Rainbow Wahine soccer players
Soccer players from Hawaii
Kansas City Current players
Women's association football forwards